The Roman Catholic Diocese of Chengde is a diocese located in the city of Chengde in the Ecclesiastical province of Beijing in China. It was erected as diocese of Chengde on 22 September 2018, taken of parts of the territories of the Diocese of Jehol and of the Diocese of Chifeng.  It was the first diocese to be erected after the China-Vatican agreement of 22 September 2018, the first new Roman Catholic diocese in China since 1949 and the first change to the Catholic hierarchy in China since 1951.

The boundaries of the diocese are equal to those of the civil prefecture-level city of Chengde in Hebei province.

References

External links
 GCatholic.org
 Catholic Hierarchy

Roman Catholic dioceses in China
Christian organizations established in 2018
Chengde
2018 establishments in China
Christianity in Hebei